Water polo was contested for men only at the 1950 Central American and Caribbean Games in Guatemala City, Guatemala.

References
 

1950 Central American and Caribbean Games
1950
1950 in water polo